Anthony Greaves is the name of:

AJ Greaves (born 2000), English footballer
Tony Greaves, Baron Greaves (1942–2021), British politician